Aleksandr Yuryevich Kovalenko (born May 8, 1963) is a Belarusian retired USSR triple jumper who won the bronze medal at the 1988 Summer Olympics. In July 1987 he achieved a personal best jump of 17.77 metres, which puts him 16th in the all-time performers list. Kovalenko trained at Armed Forces sports society in Leningrad.

References 
 
 

1963 births
Living people
People from Babruysk
Soviet male triple jumpers
Belarusian male triple jumpers
Athletes (track and field) at the 1988 Summer Olympics
Athletes (track and field) at the 1992 Summer Olympics
Olympic athletes of the Soviet Union
Olympic athletes of the Unified Team
Olympic bronze medalists for the Soviet Union
Medalists at the 1988 Summer Olympics
Olympic bronze medalists in athletics (track and field)
CIS Athletics Championships winners
Sportspeople from Mogilev Region